Greg Steinmetz  is an American journalist, author and securities analyst.

Steinmetz was born and raised in Cleveland, Ohio.  He graduated from Colgate University with a Bachelor of Arts degree in History and German, and earned a master's degree from the Medill School of Journalism at Northwestern University.

Steinmetz spent 15 years working as a journalist for the Sarasota Herald-Tribune, Houston Chronicle, Newsday, and The Wall Street Journal.  He served as the Bureau Chief for the Wall Street Journal in Berlin and London.  He is now a securities analyst for a New York money management firm.

He is also known for a well-received biography of Jacob Fugger in which he argues that Fugger was the most influential businessman in history, and possibly the richest man who ever lived.

Books
 The Richest Man Who Ever Lived: The Life and Times of Jacob Fugger. 2015. Simon and Schuster. . Review at New York Review of Books, 2016
 American Rascal: How Jay Gould Built Wall Street's Biggest. 2022. Simon and Schuster. .

References 

Newsday people
Year of birth missing (living people)
Living people
Colgate University alumni
Northwestern University alumni